Turridrupa elongata is a species of sea snail, a marine gastropod mollusk in the family Turridae, the turrids.

Distribution
This marine species occurs off the Philippines and Papua New Guinea.

References

elongata
Gastropods described in 2010